Events in the year 2021 in Iran.

Incumbents
 Supreme Leader of Iran: Ali Khamenei
 President of Iran: Hassan Rouhani (until 3 August), Ebrahim Raisi (from 3 August)
 Speaker of the Parliament: Mohammad Bagher Ghalibaf
 Chief Justice: Ebrahim Raisi (until 1 July), Gholam-Hossein Mohseni-Eje'i (from 1 July)

Events
January 8
 Supreme Leader Ali Khamenei announced that Iran would ban the import of COVID-19 vaccines from France, the United Kingdom, and the United States, and would instead obtain a vaccine from other countries.
August 5
 President-elect Ebrahim Raisi was sworn in as the new president of Iran.

Deaths

1 January – Mohammad-Taqi Mesbah-Yazdi, 85, cleric and politician (b. 1935)
9 January - Mehdi Attar-Ashrafi, 72, weightlifter (b. 1948)
12 January - Mahmoud Kianoush, 86, poet (b. 1934)
27 January - Mehrdad Minavand, 45, footballer (b. 1975)
3 February - Ali Ansarian, 43, footballer (b. 1977)
15 February - Golnoush Khaleghi, 80, musician (b. 1941)
17 February - Iraj Kaboli, 82, writer (b. 1938)
18 February - Amir Aslan Afshar, 101, politician and diplomat (b. 1919)
27 February - Nozar Azadi, 83, actor (b. 1938)
26 March - Azade Namdari, 36, TV host (b. 1984)
14 April - Mohsen Ghazi-Moradi, 80, actor (b. 1941)
15 April - Vartan Gregorian, 87, academic (b. 1934)
16 April - Nader Dastneshan, 60, football coach (b. 1960)
18 April - Mohammad Hejazi, 65, military commander (b. 1956)
26 April - Hamid Jasemian, 84, footballer (b. 1936)
10 May - Abdolvahab Shahidi, 98, singer (b. 1922)
16 May - Akbar Torkan, 68, politician (b. 1952)
25 May - Esmail Khoi, 82, poet (b. 1938)
7 June - Ali Akbar Mohtashamipur, 73, politician (b. 1947)
7 June - Sasan Niknafs, 35, political prisoner (b. 1985)
11 June - Parviz Kardan, 84, actor (b. 1936)
23 June - Hamid Mojtahedi, 79, director (b. 1942)
15 July - Hamid Reza Sadr, 65, journalist (b. 1956)
28 July - Shahrum Kashani, 47, singer (b. 1974)
31 July - Jalal Sattari, 89, writer (b. 1931)
4 August - Arsha Aghdasi, 39, stuntman actor (b. 1982)
8 August - Alireza Azizi, 72, footballer (b. 1949)
12 August - Ali Soleimani, 50, actor (b. 1970)
16 August - Fereshteh Taerpour, 68, film producer (b. 1953)
16 August - Hormoz Farhat, 93, musician (b. 1928)
19 August - Parviz Kardevani, 90, geographer (b. 1931)
3 September - Hassan Firouzabadi, 70, military commander (b. 1951)
8 September - Abbas Ansarifard, 65, football administrator (b. 1956)
25 September - Hassan Hassanzadeh Amoli, 93, cleric (b. 1928)
30 September - Hassan Tarighat Monfared, 74, politician (b. 1946)
5 October - Fathali Oveisi, 75, actor (b. 1946)
7 October - Azartash Azarnoush, 83, scholar (b. 1938)
9 October - Abolhassan Banisadr, 88, politician (b. 1933)
27 October - Aramesh Dustdar, 90, philosopher (b. 1931)
29 October - Iran Darroudi, 85, painter (b. 1936)
2 November - Cyrus Amouzgar, 87, politician (b. 1934)
6 November - Kambiz Derambakhsh, 79, cartoonist (b. 1942)
8 November - Mahlagha Mallah, 104, environmental activist (b. 1917)
18 November - Ardeshir Zahedi, 93, politician (b. 1928)
20 December - Hasan Irlu, 61-62, diplomat (b. 1959)

References 

 
Iran
Iran
2020s in Iran
Years of the 21st century in Iran